Shorty Rogers Plays Richard Rodgers is an album by American jazz trumpeter and arranger Shorty Rogers performing songs composed by Richard Rodgers, issued by RCA Victor  in 1957.

Reception

Allmusic awarded the album 4 stars.

Track listing 
All compositions by Richard Rodgers and Lorenz Hart.

 "I've Got Five Dollars" - 3:44   
 "Ten Cents a Dance" - 5:17   
 "Mountain Greenery" - 6:13   
 "A Ship Without a Sail" - 3:28   
 "Mimi" - 3:11   
 "It's Got to Be Love" - 3:58   
 "I Could Write a Book" - 4:17   
 "The Girl Friend" - 3:49   
 "On a Desert Island with Thee" - 5:23   
 "Thou Swell" - 3:19

Recorded in Los Angeles, CA on January 30, 1957 (tracks 3 & 9), February 1, 1957 (tracks 1 & 7), February 4, 1957 (tracks 4, 8 & 10) and April 3, 1957 (tracks 2, 5 & 6)

Personnel 
Shorty Rogers - trumpet, arranger
Conte Candoli, Pete Candoli (tracks 1, 3, 7 & 9), Harry Edison (tracks 1, 3, 7 & 9), Maynard Ferguson (tracks 1, 3, 7 & 9), Al Porcino (tracks 1, 3, 7 & 9) - trumpet 
Milt Bernhardt (tracks 1, 3, 7 & 9), Bob Burgess (tracks 1, 3, 7 & 9), John Halliburton (tracks 3 & 9), George Roberts (tracks 1 & 7), Frank Rosolino (tracks 1, 3, 7 & 9) - trombone
Sam Rice - tuba (tracks 1, 3, 7 & 9)
Herb Geller - alto saxophone 
Bill Holman, Jack Montrose (tracks 1, 3, 7 & 9), Bill Perkins (tracks 1, 3, 7 & 9) - tenor saxophone
Pepper Adams (tracks 1, 3, 4 & 7-10), Jimmy Giuffre (tracks 2, 5 & 6) - baritone saxophone
Pete Jolly - piano
Red Mitchell - bass 
Stan Levey - drums

References 

Shorty Rogers albums
1957 albums
RCA Records albums
Albums arranged by Shorty Rogers